Strömbäck or Stromback is a Swedish surname that may refer to:

Doug Stromback (born 1967), an American former professional hockey player 
Helge Strömbäck (1889–1960), a Swedish Navy vice admiral
Rickard Strömbäck, a Swedish former footballer
Richard Stromback (born 1969), an American former professional hockey player 

Swedish-language surnames